Orono Township is a township in Muscatine County, Iowa, in the United States.

History
Orono Township was organized on March 8, 1858.

References

Townships in Muscatine County, Iowa
Townships in Iowa
1858 establishments in Iowa